Javořice is a mountain in the Javořice Highlands mountain range within the Bohemian-Moravian Highlands in the Czech Republic.

It is located near the border between the historical lands of Bohemia and Moravia, right on trace where runs line of main European drainage divide (which runs on southern slope).

History

The first construction on the mountain was a simple cabin in 1925 as refuge for mountain hikers.

Geology
The entire massif consists mainly by moldanubic, i.e. series of rocks generated during sedimentation in precambric sea and wrinkled later into mountain chains and composed of crystalline slates and gneiss (a metamorphic rock with foliations), mica schicht and quartzite.

The summit is a round and smooth.

Flora

The summit is forested by mixed mainly spruce forest, with some pines, birches and maples. Plants: False lily, fern bracken, western oakfern, and lot of bilberryes.

Use
A TV and radio transmitter is situated on the top. It was built in 1989. The upper platform is used as a facility building by broadcaster. The mountain is also a popular area for cross-country skiing.

References

External links

Small-scale hiker map
Javořice for hikers
Article about proposed watchtower and far outlooks (Czech)

Mountains and hills of the Czech Republic